In dropwise condensation the condensate liquid collects in the form of countless droplets of varying diameters on the condensing surface, instead of forming a continuous film, and does not wet the solid cooling surface. The droplets develop at points of surface imperfections (pit, scratch), called nucleation sites, and grow in size as more vapour condenses on its exposed surface. When the size of droplets is large there comes a time the droplet breakaway from the surface and knock off other droplets and carries it downstream. The moving droplet devours the droplets of smaller size. Dropwise condensation is one of the most effective mechanism of heat transfer and extremely large heat transfer coefficients can be achieved with this mechanism. In dropwise condensation, there is no liquid film to resist heat transfer, and as a result heat transfer coefficients can be achieved more than 10 times larger than those associated with film condensation, although 3-5 times is more common. Heat transfer coefficients are large so designers can achieve a specified heat transfer rate with a smaller surface area and thus a smaller and less expensive condenser.

Dropwise condensation is achieved by adding a promoter chemical into the vapor, and/or roughened surfaces and surface and surface coated with hydrophobic impurities like fatty acids and organic compounds, known as dropwise promoters. Dropwise condensation is provoked artificially with the help of silicons, teflon, assortment of waxes, and fatty acids. These promoters are used to promote dropwise condensation but most promoters are highly unstable and lose their effectiveness with time due to oxidation, fouling and removal of the promoter from the surface. Dropwise condensation can be sustained for a long time by the combined effects of surface coating and periodic injection of the promoter into the vapor. When dropwise surfaces degrade, they convert to filmwise condensation. So most condensers are designed on the assumption that film condensation will take place on the surface eventually. Dropwise condensation is useful in powerplant heat exchangers, thermal desalination, self-cleaning surfaces, and heating and air conditioning. 

The total amount of heat transfer through a single droplet is a function of its radius and the size distribution over the condensation surface. The important factors which are involved in the mechanism of heat transfer through a single droplets are:

 Thermal conduction through a single droplet
 Thermal conduction in the substrate material
 Interphase matter transfer at the vapour liquid interface
 Curvature of the vapour-liquid interface

References

 Cengel, Y. A., Heat Transfer – A Practical Approach, International Edition,1998, McGraw-Hill.
 A. Bejan, Convection heat Transfer, pp. 445,446. Wiley, New York (1984).
 Rose, J. W. and Glicksman, L. R., “Dropwise Condensation-The Distribution of Drop Sizes”, Int. J. Heat and Mass Transfer, vol.11, pp. 411– 425,1973.
 Incropera, DeWitt, Bergman, Lavine, "fundamentals of Heat and Mass Transfer", sixth edition, pp. 655.
 Warsinger, D. M., Swaminathan, J., Maswadeh, L. and Lienhard V, J. H., "Superhydrophobic condenser surfaces for air gap membrane distillation,” Journal of Membrane Science, vol. 492, pp. 578–587, 2015.
 Miljkovic, N, Wang, E. N. "Condensation heat transfer on superhydrophobic surfaces," MRS bulletin 38 (5), 397-406, 2013.
 Cheng, Y.T., Rodak, D.E., Wong, C.A. and Hayden, C.A., Effects of micro-and nano-structures on the self-cleaning behaviour of lotus leaves. Nanotechnology, 17(5), p.1359, 2006.

Phase transitions
Heat transfer